Khojari is a town and union council in Bannu District of Khyber Pakhtunkhwa.

Its geographical location is 32.9253° N, 70.6752° E

References

Union councils of Bannu District
Populated places in Bannu District